There is incomplete list of the medalists of the Individual Ice Speedway European Championship.

Medalist

Under-21 Championships 
There is complete list of the medalists of the Individual Junior Ice Racing European Championship.

See also 
 Ice speedway
 Ice racing

References

External links 
 UEM Regulations

Ice speedway competitions